Share bazaar may refer to:

 Bombay Stock Exchange
 National Stock Exchange of India
 Share Bazaar (film), a 1997 Bollywood film